Corvus was the name of several steamships

, World War I era United States cargo ship transferred to the USSR and wrecked in 1945.

Ship names